Stradone is a village located in County Cavan, Ireland. It is situated in the civil parish of Laragh (or Larah) six miles from Cavan, near the N3 road between Cavan and Virginia. Stradone is classified as a 'small village' in the Cavan County Council Development Plan 2014-2020.

Location
Stradone is a small village approximately  directly east of Cavan. It is located just off the National Route N3, Dublin to Cavan, where the R165 regional road and L6046 local road converge. It is situated in the Stradone Local Electoral Area.

Cavan County Council estimated a population of approximately 60 persons living within the development boundary of the village.

History
Evidence of ancient settlement in the area includes a number of ringfort sites in the neighbouring townlands of Aghagolrick and Raheelagh.

A large estate house in the area, Stradone House, was built between 1828 and 1835 by architect John Benjamin Keane for the landowning Burrows family. While this burned down in 1921, during the Irish War of Independence and was subsequently demolished, a number of surrounding buildings (including stables and a gate lodge) remain.

Amenities 
The main focus of the village is Duke Park football pitch (home to Laragh United Gaelic Football Club) and the Stradone Community Centre, which contains a playschool, gym and shop. There is no school or church within the village boundary (these are located in the nearby Laragh area) and convenience retail is provided by a shop which is located beside "The Cross" public house outside the village. Stradone post office is also located at "The Cross" in Clondargan townland.

Stradone received urban renewal scheme funding in 2004 and this resulted in a village core with street furniture and planting. The bridge over the Stradone River is a feature in the village, as are the village's two water pumps (each dated to ). The Stradone River contains a Brown Trout Fishery.

The local Garda station, which was built , closed at the end of January 2013.

Transport 

The village is only served on a Tuesday and Thursday by the Bus Éireann Dundalk to Cavan route 166 at 11.22am to Cavan and 1.45pm to Dundalk via Bailieboro. Stradone was previously served by the Bus Éireann Cavan to Dublin bus.

See also
List of towns and villages in Ireland,

References

Towns and villages in County Cavan